Supriyadi Eeng (born 1 November 1993) is an Indonesian professional footballer who plays as a winger for Liga 2 club PSCS Cilacap.

Playing career

Club
Supriyadi began his professional career at Persekam Metro F.C., where he played for six seasons before moving to Persatu Tuban. He joined PSIM Yogyakarta for two seasons before returning to the club again in 2020 following short spells at Badak Lampung and Madura. Supriyadi joined Persiraja Banda Aceh where he played in fifteen matches. He then transferred to PSS Sleman, where he scored a goal against his former club in his first appearance with his new team.

Career statistics

References

External links 

Indonesian footballers
Living people
1993 births
PSS Sleman players
Persiraja Banda Aceh players
Association football midfielders
Liga 1 (Indonesia) players
Sportspeople from Malang